The David Chapman Farmstead is a historic house at 128 Stoddards Wharf Road in Ledyard, Connecticut.  Built about 1744, it is a well-preserved example of a vernacular rural farmhouse of the period, built by a descendant of one of Ledyard's early settlers.  It was listed on the National Register of Historic Places in 1992.

Description and history
The David Chapman Farmstead is located in a rural setting, on the north side of Stoddard Wharf Road just west of its crossing of Stoddard Brook.  It is a -story wood-frame structure, with a gambrel roof, central chimney, and clapboarded exterior.  Its main facade is five bays wide, the bays set somewhat regularly but not symmetrical.  The entrance is near the center, and both door and windows butt against the roof eave.  The interior of the house has exposed architectural elements showing its construction history.

The house was built in two stages by David Chapman, the grandson of one of the area's early colonial proprietors, William Chapman.  The oldest part of the house, its eastern half, dates to about 1744, and consisted of a single chamber on the ground floor with a loft in the attic, which was accessed by a ladder.  In 1756, Chapman added the western half, also probably replacing the original roof with the present gambrel.  Chapman may also have built the barn that stands at the back of the property, whose construction methods suggest it dates to the 18th century.

See also
National Register of Historic Places listings in New London County, Connecticut

References

National Register of Historic Places in New London County, Connecticut
Houses on the National Register of Historic Places in Connecticut
Colonial architecture in the United States
Houses completed in 1746
Houses in New London County, Connecticut
Ledyard, Connecticut